John 6 is the sixth chapter of the Gospel of John in the New Testament of the Christian Bible. It records Jesus' miracles of feeding the five thousand and walking on water, the Bread of Life Discourse, popular rejection of his teaching and Peter's confession of faith. The final verses anticipate Jesus' betrayal by Judas Iscariot.

The author of the book containing this chapter is anonymous, but early Christian tradition uniformly affirmed that John composed this Gospel.

Text
The original text was written in Koine Greek. This chapter is divided into 71 verses.

Textual witnesses
Some early manuscripts containing the text of this chapter are:
Papyrus 75 (AD 175–225)
Papyrus 66 (c. 200)
Papyrus 28 (c. 250)
Codex Vaticanus (325–350)
Codex Sinaiticus (330–360)
Codex Bezae (c. 400)
Codex Alexandrinus (400–440; extant verses 1–49)
Codex Ephraemi Rescriptus (c. 450; extant: verses 39–71)

Some writers place this chapter ahead of John 5. Swedish-based commentator René Kieffer considers the case for this reordering unproven, but he does recognise that chapter 6 may have been inserted into a putative second edition of the gospel. H. W. Watkins, in Ellicott's Commentary for English Readers (1905), considered whether "a portion of the Gospel between John 5 and 6 has been lost", but treats this as a "purely arbitrary supposition".

Old Testament references
 : ; ; Psalm 
 :

New Testament references
 :  – "He came to His own, and His own did not receive Him"

Places
Events recorded in this chapter refer to the following locations in Galilee:
on a mountain in a deserted place, probably to the eastern side of the Sea of Galilee (or "Sea of Tiberias") ( and )
on the Sea of Galilee itself (John 6:16–21a)
in Capernaum (John 6:21b, 6:24 and 6:59).

Boats which had come from Tiberias and sail onwards to Capernaum are also mentioned.

Structure
The New King James Version organises this chapter as follows
 : Feeding the five thousand
 : Jesus walks on the sea
 : The Bread from Heaven
 : Rejected by his own
 : Many disciples turn away

Introduction
The events recorded in chapter 5 are set in Jerusalem. As chapter 6 opens, the setting has moved to the Sea of Galilee, one hundred miles further north.
"After these things Jesus went over (or away to) the Sea of Galilee, which is the Sea of Tiberias" (New King James Version and English Standard Version texts). The Greek text reads μετα ταυτα (meta tauta, "after these things"). The New International Version translates these words as "some time after this" to remove any suggestion that the transition is immediate.

Plummer observes that "the scene shifts suddenly from Judaea to Galilee; but we are told nothing about the transit. We see more and more as we go on, that this Gospel makes no attempt to be a complete or connected whole. There are large gaps in the chronology."

Jesus travels over, or beyond, the lake: presumably from west to east. This is Albert Barnes' view, and that of Plummer. A large crowd has followed Jesus, attracted by his healings, which the Gospel describes as "signs" - a distinctive word and theme in John's Gospel. Jesus ascends the mountain and sits with his disciples - a similar setting to the opening of the Sermon on the Mount in Matthew's Gospel, in contrast to the Gospel of Luke, where the comparable event is known as the Sermon on the Plain.

And Jesus went up on the mountain, and there He sat with His disciples.

Watkins suggests that "the mountain" refers to "the hill-country" to the east of the lake, rather than to a specific mountain. The Complete Jewish Bible in like manner states that Jesus "went up into the hills".

Verse 4
Now the Passover, a feast of the Jews, was near.
Not a mere chronological note, but according to Watkins, a key to the interpretation of the passage. For Kieffer, "the approach of Passover in chapter 6 anticipates the last Passover" in chapters 13-17.

Feeding the five thousand
Jesus sees a multitude coming towards him, and wants to feed the crowd and to test his disciples, in this case Philip and Andrew. John advises his readers that "the Passover, a feast of the Jews, is approaching", but he does not refer to a journey to Jerusalem for the feast (compare ). According to the narrative of chapters 6 and 7, Jesus and his disciples did not visit Jerusalem for the Passover that year at all: they remain in Galilee until  relates a discussion as to whether they should go to Jerusalem for the subsequent Feast of Tabernacles.

In verse 5, Jesus asks Philip where they could buy sufficient bread for the crowd, assuming that the crowd (apart from one boy) had not brought their own provisions. Philip may have been the group member who looked after their money and "the care of the supply of provisions", as he was aware that they held 200 denarii between them, although  attributes this responsibility to Judas Iscariot. Philip "swiftly calculates  that "two hundred denarii worth of bread is not sufficient for [the crowd], that every one of them may have a little". In the King James Version, 200 denarii was rendered as "200 pennyworth".

Andrew, one of Jesus' disciples, Simon Peter's brother, said to Jesus: "There is a lad here who has five barley loaves and two small fish, but what are they among so many?". Watkins notes that where it appears in some manuscripts, it conveys a sense of "One lad! What could he bear for so many?" The word  occurs only here in the New Testament, and in Matthew's account the disciples themselves "have only five loaves and two fish", prompting theologian John Gill to suggest that the boy may have "belonged to Christ and his disciples, and was employed to carry their provisions for them".

No-one suggests going to the nearby lake to catch extra fish, but Jesus' actions show that the small supply of bread and fish is sufficient: he instructs his disciples to "make the people sit down" and "having given thanks" ('eucharistēsas', from which the word Eucharist is derived) for the bread and likewise for the fish, he gave them to his disciples to distribute among the crowd. The Cambridge Bible for Schools and Colleges suggests that giving thanks for the food was not only the customary thanksgiving for food but also "the means of the miracle" taking place, because (1) all four [gospel] narratives notice it; (2) it is pointedly mentioned again in :

After the meal, the fragments of the barley loaves which were left over were collected by the disciples and found to have filled twelve baskets. According to the Pulpit Commentary, "the number 'twelve' naturally suggests that each one of the twelve apostles had been employed in the collection of the fragments", although at this stage in the Gospel, "the twelve" have not yet been mentioned. Lutheran theologian Christoph Luthardt linked the twelve baskets to the twelve tribes of Israel.

Prophet and King
The crowd recognise Jesus as "the prophet who is to come" (verse 14), foretold by Moses, whose witness Jesus had affirmed in the previous chapter of the gospel (compare ), but the crowd interpret this politically and come to make Jesus king "by force". This is not Jesus' intention, so he leaves again to spend time alone on the mountain, staying until evening. Some copies add "and he prayed there"; the Syriac, Ethiopic, and Persic versions leave out the word "again"; and the latter, contrary to all others, renders it, "Christ departed from the mountain alone". St. Augustine  suggests that in their desire to make Jesus king by force, they erred both in thinking of an earthly kingdom, and in thinking that the time for the kingdom of God had now arrived. "He was certainly not such a king as would be made by men, but such as would bestow a kingdom on men". Augustine notes that "He had come now, not to reign immediately, as He is to reign in the sense in which we pray, Thy kingdom come".

Lutheran theologian Harold H. Buls considers that "this event must have been a great source of temptation, and therefore He needed to pray. He needed to pray also for His disciples".

The disciples set off by boat to cross back to Capernaum on the north-western side of the lake, leaving without Jesus:

This was a westward journey which should have allowed them to follow the coast, but for a north wind coming down from the upper Jordan valley, and the disciples are forced out into the sea. From  it seems that this boat carrying the disciples was the only one to make the journey across the sea and the crowd in general remained overnight on the eastern shore.

Jesus walks on the sea

Verse 17
And entered into a ship, and went over the sea toward Capernaum. And it was now dark, and Jesus was not come to them.
"A ship": that is, a "boat" that was large enough to hold the twelve disciples. The boat is now known as the "Jesus boat" or the "Sea of Galilee boat" although there is no known historical connection with Jesus or his disciples, but it has provided much information about design and construction of boats on the Sea of Galilee in that period. 

When the disciples had rowed about twenty five or thirty stadia (three or four miles), and were therefore in "the broadest portion of the lake", they saw Jesus walking on the sea and drawing near their boat. At its widest, the lake is about five miles broad. The disciples "willingly receive Jesus into the boat, and immediately the boat was at the land where they were going" (i.e. Capernaum). Theologian John Gill, taking his lead from the 4th or 5th century poet Nonnus, discusses whether this verse indicated an additional miracle of "immediate travel":

The word  is translated as "immediately" in most English translations but "presently" in the Douai Rheims version. The Pulpit Commentary notes a number of occasions in the New Testament where ευθεως does not "mean instantaneously, but simply that the next thing to notice or observe".

The crowd search for Jesus

Plummer considers that "We have here a complicated sentence very unusual in S. John (but compare ); it betrays a certain literary awkwardness, but great historical accuracy ... the structure of the sentence is no argument against the truth of the statements which it contains." Boats arrive from Tiberias, the new city built by Herod Antipas on the western side of the lake, and the crowd use these boats to travel to Capernaum in search of Jesus. The Geneva Bible and the King James Version describe the boats as "shipping"; the  Disciples' Literal New Testament describes them as "small boats"; and Bengel's Gnomen identifies them as "small vessels".

The crowd find Jesus "on the other side of the sea" (verse 25); they ask him, "Rabbi, when did You come here?" Jesus does not answer their question or satisfy their curiosity. George Leo Haydock suggests that he does not answer their words, "but he replied to their thoughts". Jesus comments in verse 26 that people had been looking for him, not because of the signs they had seen but because they had eaten of the loaves and were filled, although in verse 14 the evangelist had testified that they had seen the sign that Jesus did and from this sign they had recognised Him as the prophet foretold by Moses. The Pulpit Commentary argues that the distinction reflects their superficial understanding:

Discourse in the Capernaum synagogue (6:25–58)

Verses 25 to 58 present a series of dialogues and discourses which are set within the synagogue in Capernaum (cf. verse 59), and comparable to Jesus' previous dialogues with Nicodemus (chapter 3) and the Samaritan woman (chapter 4): Plummer calls the whole of this section "the Discourse on the Son as the Support of Life".

The first section (verses 25 to 34) presents a dialogue between Jesus and the Jews:
"Do not labor for the food (or meat) which perishes, but for the food which endures to everlasting life, which the Son of Man will give you, because God the Father has set His seal on Him."
"What shall we do, that we may work the works of God?"
"This is the work of God, that you believe in Him whom He sent."
"What sign will You perform then, that we may see it and believe You? What work will You do? Our fathers ate the manna in the desert; as it is written, 'He gave them bread from heaven to eat.
"Most assuredly, I say to you, Moses did not give you the bread from heaven, but My Father gives you the true bread from heaven. For the bread of God is He who comes down from heaven and gives life to the world."
"Lord (or Sir) , give us this bread always."

William Robertson Nicoll noted in the Expositor's Greek Testament that even "the food which [Jesus] had given them the evening before He called 'food which perishes': they were already hungry again, and had toiled after Him for miles to get another meal". Instead Jesus promises a different type of food which his hearers should work for: the food which endures to everlasting life. Many English translations state that Jesus (the Son of Man) will provide the food which endures, but there are variant translations which suggest that the gift Jesus refers to is eternal life, rather than imperishable food. Thus the Living Bible's paraphrase reads:

John the Baptist declared that those who would accept the testimony of Jesus would thereby certify that God is true; Jesus here declares that God the Father has set His seal on Himself. The reformer John Calvin wrote of this declaration:

The distinction between "works" and "work" in verses 28-29 provides one of the scriptural foundations for the Protestant doctrine, Sola fide ("faith alone"). Theologian Heinrich August Wilhelm Meyer commented:

The dialogue ends with the Jews asking Jesus, "Lord (or Sir), give us this bread always". The Voice translation renders 'κυριε' as 'Master', while Plummer argues that: 

In reply, Jesus makes a declaration:

Coming to Jesus is equated to believing in Him. Although the  generally means "said", the New International Version translates it more formally as "declared". This is the first of seven occasions in John's Gospel where Jesus makes a declaration in the form "I am ...". Lutheran theologian Rudolf Ewald Stier counted 35 references to "I" or "me" by Jesus in the remainder of this discourse.

At some stage, Jesus must have said to the Galileans, or possibly to others:

He refers back to that saying now, but there is no other record of this saying. "Some have supposed it to refer to an unrecorded conversation (Alford, Westcott), or even to some written sentence which is now a lost fragment of the discourse".

Jesus refers to his incarnation as a mission to fulfil the will of His Father, who had sent him. His mission is 'conservative' in the sense that He is expected "not to lose anything from what he has been given", and 'eschatological' in that He is to raise up the gift of His Father on the last day. Several commentators have noted that "All that the Father gives the Son" is a singular neuter noun: "the whole mass, so to speak, is gifted by the Father to the Son as a unity".

Rejected by His own
The Jews, including Jesus' disciples, complained among themselves (John 6:41, 43, 52, 60). The features of Jesus' teaching which were challenged were:
His claim to have come down from heaven
His statement, "I am the bread which came down from heaven"
His offer to believers to eat his flesh (and, by extension, to drink his blood).

These sayings appear to have stimulated collective debate and intellectual difficulty. The Common English Bible portrays the Jewish community in 'debate' about Jesus' sayings, whereas the Disciples' Literal New Testament says they were 'fighting'. John Gill's commentaries highlight the Jews' consistency: they grumbled "for want of bread"  in the desert, and they grumbled about Jesus' teaching "when they found that he spoke of himself as the true bread, the bread of God, and bread of life". For Jesus' disciples, His teaching was challenging. The Disciples' Literal New Testament regards it as "not hard to understand, but hard to accept, offensive, harsh, objectionable".

Jesus' claim to "have come down from heaven" is dismissed on the basis of local knowledge of Jesus and his parents:

The Pulpit Commentary notes that the evangelist does not here make reference to the virgin birth or the synoptic gospels' accounts of the conception and birth of Jesus:

Nor does John's account make reference to the brothers of Jesus, unlike comparable sections of the synoptic gospels:

Many disciples turn away

Verse 59
These things said he in the synagogue, as he taught in Capernaum.
Verse 59 implies a break in the narrative: the preceding verses represent Jesus' teaching to the Jewish community in the Capernaum synagogue, whereas the following verses portray His private discussions with the disciples struggling to grasp the meaning of His teaching. These followers were "the disciples in the wider sense; those who more or less fully were accepting His teaching, and were regarded as His followers"  but they reaction was now to think:

This teaching was "not merely harsh, but insufferable", Theologian Albert Barnes commented that "The word 'hard' here means 'offensive, disagreeable' – that which they could not bear. Some have understood it to mean 'difficult to be understood', but this meaning does not suit the connection. The doctrine which he delivered was opposed to their prejudices; it seemed to be absurd, and they therefore rejected it." Jesus' response, "Does this offend you? What then if you should see the Son of Man ascend where He was before? could be interpreted as:

or it could mean

William Robertson Nicoll suggests that "the second interpretation gives the better sense: you will find it easier to believe I came down from heaven, when you see me returning thither". In John's Gospel, Jesus' ascension "to where he was before" takes place through His death and resurrection: the Ascension on the Mount of Olives 40 days after Jesus' resurrection is not recorded in John's Gospel.

The evangelist notes that Jesus lost some of his following from that [time]  or "at this point"  or "for this reason". The text makes clear that "many left Him" and "no longer walked with Him". Jesus then asks "the twelve" whether they would also walk away. This is John's first reference to "the twelve": they have not previously been mentioned as a group or as the "twelve apostles", nor have twelve named disciples yet been introduced. (In , Andrew and Simon Peter, Philip and Nathaniel were named; Judas, son of Simon Iscariot is here named as one of the twelve whom Jesus had "chosen"). On behalf of the twelve, Simon Peter replies:

The New International Version adopts the alternative translation found in some texts:

Peter's acclamation concludes a journey of learning and faith: "we have come to believe and to know ...". Buls instead translates "we have realized ..."
The disciples "[take] Peter's answer to [Jesus'] question as delivered in the name of them all, and as expressing their mind and sense".

Jesus answered them, “Did I not choose you, the twelve, and one of you is a devil?"
Verse 71 appears to have been added by an editor: "the editor seeks to rescue Peter from the rejection saying of the Lord in verse 70. Jesus can't have called Peter 'a devil'; he must have meant Judas, the obvious traitor – so the editor appears to have reasoned". The final verse of the chapter is written in the third person style with reference to Jesus because the Evangelist explains the meaning of the previous Word of God.

At this point, the division of the text into chapters (attributed to Stephen Langton) brings chapter 6 to its close. The chapter 7 starts with the choice of Jesus to avoid the Judea and the Tribe of Judah, the tribe of the lion of Judah which is identified with Christ himself, because they "sought to kill him." If the belonging tribe of Judas the Iscariot and of Peter aren't specified, Nathanael's words "can there any good thing come out of Nazareth?" show the Tribe of Judas had a bad reputation among the other tribes.

The same kind of reputation can reasonably be extended to Judas the Iscariot whose unusual epithet was chosen by God ignoring his father's patriarchal right to the lineage, and anyway in order to be distinguished by the most common name of his native and purportedly namesake tribe. Moreover, some Christian authors affirmed Saint Matthias, who replaced the Iscariot among the Twelve after the betrayment, came from the same Tribe of Judah, probably the unique tribe remained without a councilor member in the highest organism governed by the prophesied King of Israel. We don't know the number of the members who in the Old Testament ruled on the Twelve Tribes of Israel together with the patriarchs, but other biblical passages suggest the patriarch (the King of Israel before entering in the Promised Land) was recommended by God to systematically consult them and that they were twelve in many relevant moments of the life of Israel ( and ). Going back to the New Testament, the King of Israel fully reconfirmed the whole Mosaic Law, even in the never interrupted and divine election of the governing system of the Twelve Tribes of Israel.
It is a textual comment linking John 6 to other parts of the Old and New Testament, needing a more accurate and complex evaluation of the Holy Scripture.

See also
Bread of Life Discourse
Capernaum
Jesus Christ
Manna
Sea of Galilee
Related Bible parts: Exodus 16, Matthew 14, Mark 6, Luke 9, John 8, John 10,  John 14, John 15

Notes

References

External links
 King James Bible - Wikisource
English Translation with Parallel Latin Vulgate
Online Bible at GospelHall.org (ESV, KJV, Darby, American Standard Version, Bible in Basic English)
Multiple bible versions at Bible Gateway (NKJV, NIV, NRSV etc.)

John 06
Bethsaida